The Pakistan women's national cricket team toured Ireland and England in May and June 2009. They played Ireland in 1 One Day International and 1 Twenty20 International (their first ever in the format), winning the ODI but losing the T20I. They then played in the RSA T20 Cup against Ireland and Nottinghamshire, which they won with four wins from their four matches. Finally they travelled to England, and played England Academy in 3 T20s, after which they competed in the 2009 ICC Women's World Twenty20.

Tour of Ireland

Squads

Only T20I

Only ODI

RSA T20 Cup

Squads

Fixtures

Tour of England

T20 Series v England Academy

1st T20

2nd T20

3rd T20

See also
 2009 RSA T20 Cup
 2009 ICC Women's World Twenty20

References

External links
Pakistan Women tour of Ireland 2009 from Cricinfo

Pakistan women's national cricket team tours
Women's cricket tours of England
Women's international cricket tours of Ireland
International cricket competitions in 2009
2009 in women's cricket
2009 in Pakistani women's sport